Burpee Laban Steeves (July 7, 1868 – October 23, 1933) was a Republican politician from Idaho. Steeves served as the ninth lieutenant governor of Idaho from 1905 to 1907 during the administration of Governor Frank R. Gooding.

External links

Burpee L. Steeves entry at The Political Graveyard

Idaho Republicans
Lieutenant Governors of Idaho
1868 births
1933 deaths